The Frankiales are an order of bacteria, containing three monotypic families, each with only one genus.

References 

Actinomycetia